Rasel Mahmud Liton (born November 30, 1994) is a Bangladeshi professional footballer who plays as a goalkeeper for Sheikh Jamal DC in Bangladesh Premier League and Bangladesh national team.

International career

Youth
In 2011, Liton debuted for Bangladesh U19. He represented Bangladesh in 2012 AFC U-19 Championship qualification. He played all the five matches and kept cleansheet against Maldives U19.

On 25 August 2014, Liton made his debut for Bangladesh U-23 against Nepal U-23 in an International Friendly On 27 July 2014 he was selected by Lodewijk de Kruif for the 2014 Asian Games, held in Incheon, South Korea.

Senior
After the Asian Games, Liton was called up by de Kruif for two friendly matches against Sri Lanka in October 2014, at Jessore and Rajshahi, Bangladesh. He made his debut in the first match, on 24 October. He kept his first clean sheet in second match, on 27 October.

Career statistics

International

References

1994 births
Living people
Bangladeshi footballers
Bangladesh international footballers
Association football goalkeepers
Muktijoddha Sangsad KC players
Footballers at the 2014 Asian Games
Asian Games competitors for Bangladesh
Rahmatganj MFS players
Sheikh Russel KC players
Sheikh Jamal Dhanmondi Club players
Bangladesh Football Premier League players